The Coronoid process (from Greek , "like a crown") can refer to:
 The coronoid process of the mandible, part of the ramus mandibulae of the mandible
 The coronoid process of the ulna, a triangular eminence projecting forward from the upper and front part of the ulna